Singer is a surname. Notable people with the surname include:

Business and industry 
 Baruch Singer (born 1954), American real estate investor
 Carl Singer (1916–2008), American businessman, investor, and philanthropist
 George Singer (cycle manufacturer) (1874–1909), English cycle manufacturer
 John Webb Singer (1819–1904), English bronze founder
 Horace M. Singer (1823–1896), American businessman and politician
 Isaac Singer (1811–1875), American inventor of the modern sewing machine and founder of the Singer Corporation
 Lauren Singer, environmental activist, entrepreneur, and blogger
 Lavoslav Singer (1866–1942), Croatian industrialist
 Linda Singer (born 1966), American attorney
 William Rick Singer, American consultant who pleaded guilty to bribing college admission officials

Arts and entertainment 
 Abby Singer (1917–2014), American production manager and assistant director
 Alexander Singer (born 1928), American director
 Andy Singer (born 1965), American political cartoonist
 Angela Singer (born 1966), artist
 Arthur B. Singer (1917–1990), American wildlife artist
 Artie Singer (1919–2008), American songwriter, music producer and bandleader
 Aubrey Singer (1927–2007), CBE British broadcasting executive
 Benno Singer (1875–1934), Hungarian-born British entertainment administrator
 Bob Singer (born 1928), American artist and character designer
 Bobbie Singer (born 1981), Austrian singer
 Brooke Singer (born 1972), New York City–based media artist
 Bryan Singer (born 1965), American film director, nephew of Jacques Singer, cousin of Lori and Marc Singer
 Burr Singer (1912–1992), American artist
 Campbell Singer (1909–1976), British character actor
 Donna Singer (born 1965), American jazz vocalist
 Dulcy Singer, American television producer
 Eric Singer (born 1958), American rock drummer
 Eric Warren Singer, American screenwriter
 Hal Singer (1919–2020), American R&B and jazz bandleader and saxophonist
 Henry Singer (born 1957), documentary filmmaker
 Jacques Singer (1910–1980), Polish-born American violinist, orchestra conductor, father of Lori and Marc Singer
 Jeanne Singer (1924–2000), American pianist, teacher, and composer of lyrical poetry
 Jeff Singer (born 1971), British musician and drummer
 Jill Singer (1957–2017), Australian journalist, writer, and television presenter
 Jonathan M. Singer, podiatrist and award-winning photographer
 Josh Singer (born 1972), American film/television writer and producer
 Leah Singer, photographer and multimedia artist
 Leo Singer (1877–1951), vaudeville manager
 Loren Singer (1923–2009), American novelist
 Lori Singer (born 1957), American actress, daughter of Jacques Singer, sister of Marc Singer
 Marc Singer (born 1948), American TV actor, son of Jacques Singer, brother of Lori Singer
 Mike Singer (born 2000), German pop singer
Simon Singer (born 1941), American world champion American handball player, and radio and television actor

Poets and authors 
 Burns Singer (1928–1964), American poet
 Christiane Singer (1943–2007), French writer, essayist, and novelist
 Isaac Bashevis Singer (1902–1991), Polish-born American novelist and younger brother of Israel Joshua Singer
 Israel Joshua Singer (1893–1944), Polish-born American a novelist and elder brother of Isaac Bashevis Singer
 Margot Singer, American writer

Characters 
 Addie Singer, fictional character from the TV show Unfabulous
 Alvy Singer, lead character played by Woody Allen in the movie Annie Hall

Scientists, educators, scholars 
Amy Singer, Ottoman historian
André Vítor Singer (born 1958), political sciences professor
 C. Gregg Singer (1910–1999), American historian and theologian
 Charles Singer (1876–1960), British historian
 Dorothea Waley Singer (1882–1964), historian of science
 E. C. Singer, American engineer
 Edgar Arthur Singer (1873–1954), American philosopher
 Eleanor Singer (1930–2017), Austrian-born American expert on survey methodology
 Fred Singer (born 1924), Austrian-born American physicist and professor
 George Singer (1786–1817), English early pioneer of electrical research
 Hans Singer (1910–2006), German economist
 Ignatius Singer (c. 1853–1926), British writer and social reformer
 Irving Singer (1925–2015), American professor of philosophy
 Isadore Singer (1924-2021), American mathematician
 Isidore Singer (1859–1939), editor of the Jewish Encyclopedia
 Itamar Singer (1946–2012), Israeli archaeologist
 J. David Singer (1925–2009), American professor of political science
 Josef Singer (1923–2009), Israeli President of Technion – Israel Institute of Technology
 Joseph W. Singer, American legal theorist
 Judith D. Singer, American academic, statistician, and social scientist
 June Singer (1920–2004), American analytical psychologist
 Kurt Singer (1886–1962), German economist and philosopher
 Marcus George Singer (1926–2016), American philosopher
 Michael F. Singer (born 1950), American mathematician
 P. W. Singer, (né Peter Warren Singer, born 1973/74), American scholar of politics and war
 Peter Singer (born 1946), Australian philosopher concerned with treatment of animals and other ethical topics
 Rolf Singer (1906–1994), German-born mycologist
 Ronald Singer (1924−2006), South African-born anatomist and university professor (Chicago)
 Samuel Weller Singer (1783–1858), English author, Shakespeare scholar and historian of card games
 Seymour Jonathan Singer (1924–2017), American cell biologist and university professor
 Stephen Singer-Brewster (born 1945), American astronomer
 Tanja Singer (born 1969), German neuroscientist
 Wolf Singer (born 1943), German neurophysiologist

Applied medicine and clinical psychology 
 Alfred Singer (born 1946), American immunologist
 Amy Singer (born 1953), Florida trial consultant and research psychologist
 Donald Singer, president of the Fellowship of Postgraduate Medicine
 Margaret Singer (1921–2003), American clinical psychologist
 Jerome L. Singer (1924–2019), American psychology professor
 Jerome E. Singer (1934–2010), psychologist
 Peter A. Singer (born 1960), (né Peter Alexander Singer; born c. 1960), Canadian physician and bioethicist

Public service 
 Arlene Singer (born 1948), judge

 Cecile D. Singer (born 1929), New York politician
 Gary Singer, Australian politician
 Israel Singer (born 1942), secretary general of the World Jewish Congress
 Jack Singer (1917–2013), Canadian real estate developer, financier, and philanthropist
 Joseph Singer (politician) (1890–1967), Toronto city councillor and lawyer
 Leonard Singer (born 1943), British politician and pharmacist
 Mark Singer, doctor
 Paul Singer (1844-1911), German politician
 Peter Singer (judge) (1944–2018), judge of the High Court of England and Wales
 Vlado Singer (1908–1943), Croatian politician
 William Singer, Chicago alderman

Sports 
 Al Singer (1909–1961), American boxer
 Andreas Singer (born 1946), Slovak football manager and former player
 Bill Singer (born 1944), American former professional baseball pitcher
 Brady Singer (born 1996), American college baseball pitcher
 Chantal Singer, Canadian water skier
 Christina Singer (born 1968), German tennis player
 Heike Singer (born 1964), East German sprint canoer
 Jimmy Singer (1937–2010), Welsh professional footballer
 Joachim Singer (born 1942), German hurdler
 Karin Singer (born 1966), former synchronized swimmer
 Karl Singer (born 1943), American football player
 Kyle Singer (born 1980), American soccer player
 Rory Singer (born 1976), American mixed martial artist 
 Sam Singer (born 1995), American-Israeli basketball player for Israeli team Bnei Herzliya
Simon Singer (born 1941), American world champion American handball player, and radio and television actor
 Walt Singer (1911–1992), American football player

Other uses 
 Holm Singer (born 1961), former East German Stasi informant
 Winnaretta Singer (1865–1943), princess and daughter of Isaac Merrit Singer

Other disambiguations 
 Alex Singer (disambiguation)
 André Singer (disambiguation)
 Daniel Singer (disambiguation)
 David Singer (disambiguation)
 I. M. Singer (disambiguation)
 James Singer (disambiguation)
 Jerome Singer (disambiguation)
 John Singer (disambiguation)
 Jonathan Singer (disambiguation)
 Peter Singer (disambiguation)

See also 
 Singer (disambiguation)
 Sanger (surname)
 Chief Singer
 Singer Usha (born 1979)

English-language surnames
German-language surnames
Jewish surnames